Alexander George Gordon, 7th Marquess of Aberdeen and Temair,  (31 March 1955 – 12 March 2020) was a Scottish peer and the son of Alastair Gordon, 6th Marquess of Aberdeen and Temair.

Life
Gordon was educated at Cothill House, Abingdon, and Harrow School.

He was appointed a Deputy Lieutenant of Aberdeenshire in 1998.

The Dowager Marchioness is a patron of Haddo House Choral and Operatic Society.

Marriage and issue
He married Joanna Clodagh Houldsworth in 1981. They had four children:
 George Ian Alastair Gordon, 8th Marquess of Aberdeen and Temair (b. 4 May 1983). He married Isabelle Coaten. They have two sons and one daughter:
 Ivo Alexander Ninian Gordon, Earl of Haddo (b. 18 July 2012)
 Lord Johnny David Nehemiah Gordon (b. 23 June 2014)
 Lady Christabel Alexandra Lully Gordon (b. 1 March 2016)
 Lord Louis George Solomon Gordon (b. 5 September 2018)
 Lord Sam Dudley Gordon (b. 25 October 1985). Lord Sam is married to Isobel Tatham. They have one son and one daughter:
 Bertie Raiph Dudley Gordon (b. 30 August 2016)
 Lara Sophie Bebe Gordon (b. 21 September 2018)
 Lady Anna Katherine Gordon (b. 2 September 1988). Lady Anna is married to Sarah McChesney (b. 1987) in 2017.
 Lord Charles David Gordon (b. 8 June 1996)

References

 Burke's Peerage
 Who's Who 2009

External links
 Alexander Gordon, 7th Marquess of Aberdeen and Temair

 

1955 births
2020 deaths
7
People educated at Cothill House
People educated at Harrow School
Deputy Lieutenants of Aberdeenshire